La Prière du Para (The Paratrooper's Prayer) is a French poem found in the possession of the presumed author, Aspirant (Brevet-Lieutenant) André Zirnheld, upon his death in Libya on July 27, 1942.  The Paratrooper's Prayer has been adopted by all French Metropolitan and Marine Infantry Paratrooper Units and Regiments .
The Prayer appears before A. J. Quinnell's novel Man on Fire, the main protagonist of which is an ex-paratrooper in the Legion.  This prayer also appears in Lt. Col. Dave Grossman's book, On Combat: The Psychology and Physiology of Deadly Conflict in War and in Peace, Rogue Heroes by Ben Macintyre, and Call Sign Chaos: Learning to Lead by Jim Mattis.

The Prayer of the Paratrooper
(Translation by Robert Petersen)
I'm asking You God, to give me what You have left.
Give me those things which others never ask of You.
I don't ask You for rest, or tranquility.
Not that of the spirit, the body, or the mind.
I don't ask You for wealth, or success, or even health.
All those things are asked of You so much Lord,
that you can't have any left to give.
Give me instead Lord what You have left.
Give me what others don't want.
I want uncertainty and doubt.
I want torment and battle.
And I ask that You give them to me now and forever Lord,
so I can be sure to always have them,
because I won't always have the strength to ask again.
But give me also the courage, the energy,
and the spirit to face them.
I ask You these things Lord,
because I can't ask them of myself(*).

(*) The French text says rather:
For only You can grant
What can come only from myself.

References
Anthony W. Pahl, International War Veterans' Poetry Archive

Christian prayer

1942 documents